Pressman can refer to:
 Pressman (name)
 Pressman Toy Corporation
 The operator of a printing press or machine press
 An employee of a newspaper (British usage)
 A line of Sony portable tape recorders launched in 1977, from which the original Walkman was developed